Thomas Wayne Markle (born July 18, 1944) is an American retired television lighting director and director of photography. 
He received a Chicago/Midwest Emmy Award for work on the television program Made in Chicago in 1975 and was a co-recipient of two Daytime Emmy Awards for work on the television soap opera General Hospital in 1982 and 2011. His youngest child is Meghan, Duchess of Sussex.

Early life
Thomas Wayne Markle Sr. was born on July 18, 1944 and raised in Newport, Pennsylvania, the son of Doris May Rita (née Sanders; 1920–2011) and Gordon Arnold Markle (1918–1979). His mother's family was from New Hampshire. The Markle (formerly spelled Merckel) family on his father's side claims ethnic German 18th-century origins from Alsatian town of Lampertsloch, Hanau-Lichtenberg, now part of Bas-Rhin, France. He has two brothers, Michael (1939–2021) and Frederick (also known as Dismas F. Markle; born 1942). He was raised in an Anglican Christian denomination.

Among Markle's distant ancestors are his paternal great-great-grandmother, New Hampshire landowner Mary Hussey Smith (died 1908), who was a descendant of Christopher Hussey. He also descends from Sir Philip Wentworth and Mary Clifford, a daughter of John Clifford, 7th Baron Clifford and Lady Elizabeth Percy, a descendant of Edward III.

Career
Markle worked as a lighting director at WTTW-TV Channel 11 in the 1970s. In 1975, he received a Chicago / Midwest Emmy Award for Outstanding Achievement for Individual Excellence: Non Performers for his lighting design work on the channel's Made in Chicago program. He worked on the television series General Hospital and Married... with Children. He also oversaw the lighting for the 1984 Summer Olympics.

Awards

In 1982, Markle was one of the 14 named co-recipients of a Daytime Emmy Award for Outstanding Achievement in Design Excellence for a Daytime Drama Series for work on General Hospital, and in 2011, he shared a Daytime Emmy Award with Vincent Steib for Outstanding Achievement in Lighting Direction for a Drama Series for work on General Hospital. He was also nominated (with various co-nominees) for Daytime Emmy Awards for work on General Hospital on seven other occasions.

Markle was nominated, along with two other co-nominees, for a Primetime Emmy Award in 1986 for Outstanding Lighting Direction (Electronic) for a Miniseries or a Special for the lighting design for the 58th Academy Awards.

Personal life
Markle married student and secretary Roslyn Loveless in 1964; they had met the year before at a campus party at the University of Chicago. They had two children, Yvonne Marie Markle (who later changed her name to Samantha) in 1964 and Thomas Wayne Markle Jr. in 1966, before divorcing in 1975.
 
He married Doria Ragland at the Self-Realization Fellowship Temple of Paramahansa Yogananda in Hollywood, Los Angeles, on December 23, 1979, officiated by Brother Bhaktananda. Their daughter Rachel Meghan Markle (known by her middle name), who later became the Duchess of Sussex, was born on August 4, 1981. The couple split when their daughter was two years old. Their marriage ended in divorce in 1987. Both parents contributed to raising Meghan and, at the age of 9, she started living full-time with her father as Ragland pursued a career. He paid for Meghan's entire private education from preschool at Hollywood Little Red Schoolhouse to Northwestern University as well as other living expenses. In addition to his regular job, Markle spent time helping with lighting for plays and musicals at Immaculate Heart High School, which Meghan attended.

In 2016, Markle filed for bankruptcy for a second time over a debt of $30,000. He lives in Rosarito, Mexico.

In May 2018, Markle underwent a heart surgery days before his daughter Meghan's wedding to Prince Harry. In May 2022, he was hospitalized after suffering a stroke.

In media
In 2018, Markle was the subject of considerable media speculation as to whether he would attend his daughter Meghan's wedding to Prince Harry, at Windsor Castle in the United Kingdom. He did not attend as he was recovering from heart surgery after being discharged from the hospital two days before the wedding. He later claimed that he was never sent a formal invitation.

In May 2018, a few days before the wedding, Markle became a subject of controversy after it was revealed that he had staged photographs for a paparazzi photographer in return for money. His elder daughter, Samantha, later claimed that it was her idea, and that her father's motivation was not financial but "to show the world that [he's] getting in shape and doing great healthy things." Markle admitted that he initially had lied to Harry about the staged photos and later regretted his decision. Later it was claimed that the photographer who took the pictures previously worked for Meghan and had been hired by her after she moved back to the United States. In November 2021, Markle sued the photo agency Coleman-Rayner in Los Angeles County Superior Court and sought $1 million in damages, alleging that the staged paparazzi photos were published without his approval and he was not given his 30% share of sales from images in accordance with their initial contract. In September 2022, a judge issued a restraining order instructing Markle to keep away from Jeff Rayner for the next two years as Rayner claimed that Markle had threatened to kill him in his statements published in Tom Bower's book Revenge: Meghan, Harry and the War Between the Windsors. The case against the photo agency was dismissed in January 2023.

In June 2018, he appeared on Good Morning Britain in which he discussed his personal relationship with Meghan and his son-in-law. In another interview with The Mail on Sunday in July 2018, Markle said that his daughter "[would] be nothing without me. I made her the Duchess she is today." His continual paid interviews with the press reportedly damaged his relationship with his daughter, with whom he indicated he had not been in contact since the royal wedding.

In February  2019, he published excerpts of a letter sent to him by his daughter shortly after her wedding in direct response to a People article involving five of Meghan's friends referencing the letter and negatively commenting on his character, in which she stated that he had broken her heart "into a million pieces" with his actions. Markle described the letter as a "a dagger to the heart" rather than an "olive branch".

In January 2020, it was revealed that The Mail on Sunday could possibly use evidence provided by Markle against his own daughter in an ongoing legal battle between the paper and the Duchess. The Daily Mail also named him as a potential witness who could testify against Meghan in court. In the same month, he said in an interview that Meghan is "tossing away every young girl's dream of becoming a princess, for money", and that she and Harry are "destroying and cheapening" the royal institution, and that they are "lost souls". He also stated that he does not expect to see Meghan ever again but still hopes for reconciliation one day.

In July 2021, Markle stated that he would be petitioning California courts for rights to see his grandchildren Archie and Lilibet Mountbatten-Windsor.

In 2022, he began publishing videos on the YouTube channel Remarkable Friendship together with photographer Karl Larsen although he claims to have severed their relationship after recording their last video.

References

External links
 

1944 births
American expatriates in Mexico
American lighting designers
American people of English descent
American people of German descent
Daytime Emmy Award winners
Living people
Markle family
People from Newport, Pennsylvania